Alani Nicole "La La" Anthony (née Vázquez; born June 25, 1980) is an American television personality and actress. In the early 2000s, she worked as an MTV VJ on Total Request Live. She was the host of the VH1 reality television reunion shows Flavor of Love, I Love New York, For the Love of Ray J, and Real Chance of Love, and was a dean on Charm School with Ricki Lake.

Anthony appeared in Two Can Play That Game (2001), You Got Served (2004), Think Like a Man (2012), Think Like a Man Too (2014), November Rule (2015) and Destined (2015). She appeared as Lakeisha Grant in the Starz original drama series Power. She hosted the American reality television series La La's Full Court Wedding and La La's Full Court Life. She married NBA player Carmelo Anthony in 2010, and currently stars in 50 cent’s “BMF” series as Markeisha Taylor.

Early life
Anthony was born in Brooklyn, New York. Her parents, who are of Puerto Rican heritage, were born and raised in New York City. Anthony (who describes herself as an Afro-Puerto Rican) has a younger brother and two younger sisters. As a young child, she was involved in many activities, but music was her main interest. She went to Howard University, where she studied communications but did not graduate.

Career

At the age of 15, Anthony started working in radio at WHTA-FM, HOT 97.5 in Georgia. After a short internship at that station, and while still in high school, she hosted Future Flavas, alongside rapper/actor Ludacris.

At 19, Anthony worked at Los Angeles's 92.3 The Beat cohosting The B-Syde. She left the station in 2001 and moved to MTV where she cohosted Direct Effect and Total Request Live.

In 2003, Anthony left MTV. She worked as a producer on Mike Tyson’s documentary, Tyson, which won the Regard Knockout Award in France and was included in the 2009 Cannes Film Festival. Anthony also produced a feature film with director/producer Brett Ratner.

Anthony appeared in films Two Can Play That Game, Think Like a Man, Baggage Claim and television shows "NYC 22" and  Single Ladies. Other film credits include Urban Massacre (2002), Monster Island (2004), and You Got Served (2004).

In October 2011, Anthony appeared in the off-Broadway production of Love Loss and What I Wore. Anthony appeared in and executive produced La La's Full Court Wedding, which chronicled the time leading up to her wedding to NBA star Carmelo Anthony.

On February 2, 2012, she launched a cosmetic line and in 2013 a clothing line.  She has written several books. Anthony co-produced the Broadway production of Danai Gurira's Eclipsed in 2016.

Personal life
On Christmas Day 2004, La La became engaged to basketball player Carmelo Anthony, whom she met in 2003. In September 2006, it was announced that the two were expecting a child. Their son was born on March 7, 2007. They were married by Michael Eric Dyson on July 10, 2010, at Cipriani's in New York before 320 guests. The ceremony was filmed by VH1 and aired as part of a reality series on the couple, titled La La's Full Court Wedding. The couple's life together was also chronicled on their continuation series, La La's Full Court Life. In June 2021, La La filed for divorce.

Filmography

Film
You People

Television

Music videos

See also

 List of notable Puerto Ricans
 :Category:Hip hop DJs

References

External links

 
 MTV.com-Onair- Meet the Vjs
 Read MTV's profile of La La on MTV.TV
 LaLa Vazquez interview with DJ Whoo Kid, Sirius Radio/RadioPlanet.tv

1979 births
Actresses from New York City
Age controversies
American actresses of Puerto Rican descent
Howard University alumni
Living people
Participants in American reality television series
People from Brooklyn
People of Afro–Puerto Rican descent
VJs (media personalities)
Basketball players' wives and girlfriends